Bobó de camarão, sometimes referred to as shrimp bobó in English, is a chowder-like Brazilian dish of shrimp in a purée of manioc (or cassava) meal with coconut milk, herbs, ginger, and other ingredients.

Origin 
Shrimp bobó is nearly identical to the West African dish Ipetê, and it is one of the many iconic recipes from the Bahia region of Brazil, which is known for its heavy Afro-Brazilian characteristics. The name bobó comes from the Fon word bovô.

Preparation 
Like many similar dishes, it is flavored with palm oil, called dendê in Brazilian Portuguese. It is traditionally served with white rice, but it may also be served with another manioc dish called pirão or with the ritual Candomblé dish acaçá. It can also be treated as a standalone side dish. In the state of Espírito Santo, due to Italian influences, olive oil is used instead of palm oil.

See also

 List of Brazilian dishes
 List of cream soups

References

Brazilian stews
Shrimp dishes
Bahia
Fish and seafood soups
Cream soups